Fenglin County is a county in Heilongjiang Province, China. It is under the administration of the prefecture-level city of Yichun. The county was established by merging the former Xinqing District, Wuying District and Hongxing District approved by Chinese State Council in 2019. The county seat is Xinqing Subdistrict.

Administrative divisions 
Fenglin County is divided into 14 subdistricts. 
14 subdistricts
 Liming Shequ, Hongjianzhongxin Shequ, Xinmin Shequ, Fumin Shequ, Yulinyi Shequ, Xinlizhongxin Shequ, Dongsheng Shequ, Qianjin Shequ, Tuanjie Shequ, Yulin Shequ, Jianlin Shequ, Songlin Shequ, Xinlin Shequ, Wuxing Shequ

References

Yichun